Alberto Pasquali (1882–1929) was an Italian stage and film actor of the silent era.

Selected filmography
 Christus (1916)
 Redemption (1919)
 Pleasure Train (1924)
 Latest Night News (1924)
 The Passion of St. Francis (1927)
 Kif Tebbi (1928)
 The Last Tsars (1928)
 Call at Midnight (1929)

References

Bibliography
 Ann C. Paietta. Saints, Clergy and Other Religious Figures on Film and Television, 1895–2003. McFarland, 2005.

External links

1882 births
1929 deaths
Italian male film actors
Italian male stage actors
Actors from Turin